This is a list programs broadcast by Astro Bella.

Current programmes

Mexico (Viva Latina)
 Amor Cautivo
 La Otra Cara del Alma

Colombia
 Amar y temer
 Primera dama

Philippines (Lara Asia)
 Chances
 Golden Heart
 Grazilda
 In Love Again
 Majika
 More Than Love
 Pangako Sayo
 Walang Hanggan

United States
 Grachi

Dramas from Astro Mustika HD (Dramathon)
 Bercakap Dengan Jin
 Bukan Kerana Aku Tak Cinta
 Kusinero Cinta
 Sahangat Amara

Former programmes

Colombia
 El secretario

Mexico
 Drowning City (Drenaje Profundo)
 Emperatriz
 Forever Yours (Eternamente Tuya)
 La usurpadora
 The Force of Destiny (La Fuerza del Destino)
 Infamia (Torn Apart)
 Pasión Morena
 Pobre Diabla Daniela
 Quererte Así

Korea
 What Women Want (당돌한 여자)

Italy
 Girlfriends (Amiche mie)
 Surgeons (La scelta di Laura)

Philippines
 Beauty Queen
 Budoy
 Destined Hearts (Dahil May Isang Ikaw)
 Encantadia
 Fish Port Princess (Prinsesa ng Banyera)
 Heaven with You (Langit sa Piling Mo)
 Imortal
 Impostor (Precious Hearts Romances Presents: Impostor)
 Impostora
 My Only One (Iisa Pa Lamang)
 Rivals (Magkaribal)
 Stand for Love (Gulong ng Palad)
 To Love You (Ikaw Sana)
 The Two of Us (Tayong Dalawa)
 Until Forever (Ngayon at Kailanman)

Portugal
 Cidade Despida
 Direct Flight (Voo Directo)

United Arab Emirates
 Critical Moments (Lahazat Harega)

Astro Bella